The Journal of Early Intervention is a quarterly peer-reviewed academic journal that covers the field of special education. The journal's editor-in-chief is Laurie A. Dinnebeil (University of Toledo).

Abstracting and indexing 
The journal is abstracted and indexed in Scopus and the Social Sciences Citation Index. According to the Journal Citation Reports, its 2017 impact factor is 1.241, ranking it 18th out of 40 journals in the category "Education, Special",. 39th out of 69 journals in the category "Rehabilitation", and 38th out of 59 journals in the category "Psychology, Educational".

References

External links 
 
 Division for Early Childhood

SAGE Publishing academic journals
English-language journals
Quarterly journals
Special education journals
Publications established in 1981